The 1991 Dutch TT was the ninth round of the 1991 Grand Prix motorcycle racing season. It took place on the weekend of 27–29 June 1991 at the TT Circuit Assen located in Assen, Netherlands.

500 cc race report
Kevin Schwantz on pole, and he gets the start from Wayne Rainey and Mick Doohan. Rain brings out a red flag on lap 4, with Doohan in 1st and Rainey in 5th .85 seconds behind.

Race 2 will be on aggregate time. Rainey gets the first turn from Wayne Gardner and Doohan. Alex Barros bumps Schwantz’ Suzuki with his elbow.

Rainey is opening a gap to Doohan, Gardner, Schwantz and Eddie Lawson. Schwantz and Doohan fight for 2nd and Gardner drops to 4th.

Doohan lowsides out of second and slides into a bale-covered fence, hitting it hard with his upper body. He’s not getting up.

A win would put Rainey ahead of Doohan on points, but Schwantz is closing as they head into the last lap. Schwantz is too far away to pass on the brakes, but at the chicane, Rainey makes a big mistake and goes wide on the exit, having to sit up and ride through the grass. He exits just before Schwantz gets to him, but Schwantz has momentum and takes the win on the line.

On the cool down lap, Rainey and Schwantz exchange a handshake and teasing jabs and Rainey put his head on the tank in embarrassment. On the podium, Rainey is subdued but not angry-looking.

Schwantz: "On the last lap Wayne put together a lap that had absolutely no flaws in it anywhere. Coming into the chicane for the last time I'm sure he had me by more than three quarters of a second. He just outbroke himself going in, got on the grass and I managed to beat him across the line. I kind of feel that it was Hockenheim that caused it to happen, I know that's all Wayne was thinking about, that he wasn't going to let me do the same thing I'd done to him in Germany. I think had he taken a quick glance over his shoulder anywhere round that last lap he would have realised it wasn't down to an outbraking manoeuvre at the chicane, he had me beat."

500 cc classification

References

Dutch TT
Dutch
Tourist Trophy
Dutch TT